Imiola Church is a historic wood structure in Waimea, on the Island of Hawaii, coordinates .

History

The church was designed by its first pastor, Lorenzo Lyons.
A grass hut had been built on this spot for visiting preachers some time before 1832 when Rev. Lyons arrived.
A new building was constructed of stone walls with a thatched roof between 1837 and 1843. One reason was the earthquake and tsunami of 1837 which caused some to believe (as preached by Millerism) that a new Advent of Christ would arrive in 1843. However, membership of the parish dropped from a high of almost 5,000 to about 1200 by 1841.

The altar of hand carved Hawaiian wood in the church was made by David McHattie Forbes and completed after his death in 1937 by his oldest son David Merlyn Lougher Forbes. The calabash bowl light fixtures are a distinctive design feature inspired by the same native Hawaiian form. Some of the walls of the old church still stand, enclosing the grave site of Rev. Lyons, his wife, and a young son.
The name comes from 'imi ola in the Hawaiian Language which means "seek salvation".

Today

In 1955 the paint was removed from the interior and natural finish of koa wood was restored.
The church continues to be in use and is usually open to the public.
The church belongs to the Hawaii Island Association of the Hawaii Conference of the United Church of Christ. The state registry lists it as site 10-06-7151 as of July 25, 1981.
On August 28, 1975 it was added to the National Register of Historic Places as site number 75000618.

Gallery

References

Further reading

Churches on the National Register of Historic Places in Hawaii
United Church of Christ churches in Hawaii
Religious buildings and structures in Hawaii County, Hawaii
1832 establishments in Hawaii
Churches completed in 1837
Churches completed in 1855
National Register of Historic Places in Hawaii County, Hawaii